The South Sudan Women's National League is the top flight of women's association football in South Sudan. The competition is run by the South Sudan Football Association.

History
The South Sudan Women's National League was created on 2021. The first winners of the league was Yei Join Stars FC.

Champions
The list of champions and runners-up:

Most successful clubs

References

External links 
 SSFA fb official website

Women's association football leagues in Africa
Football competitions in South Sudan
Women
Sports leagues established in 2021
Women's sport in South Sudan